Bottnaryd is a locality situated in Jönköping Municipality, Jönköping County, Sweden with 713 inhabitants in 2010.

References

External links

Populated places in Jönköping Municipality